Poundage quotas were authorized by the Agricultural Adjustment Act of 1938, so the peanut poundage quota was the supply control mechanism for the peanut price support program until its revision in the 2002 farm bill (P.L. 107-171, Sec. 1301-1310).

The 1996 farm bill (P.L. 104-127) required that (for the 1996-2002 crops) the poundage quota be set equal to projected food demand and related uses. The national quota was allocated among states based on historical shares, and then divided among farms based on production history. Owners (via inheritance or purchase) of quota were allowed to sell peanuts produced against their quota, or sell, lease and transfer their quota to other producers. Peanuts marketed above the quota limits (called additional peanuts) had to be crushed for non-edible uses or exported.

The 2002 farm bill eliminated peanut quotas and the two-tiered pricing structure and replaced this with a support program comparable to that for so-called covered commodities -- such as wheat, feedgrains, cotton, and rice—as well as with buy-out funding.

References 

Federal Agriculture Improvement and Reform Act of 1996
Peanuts
Quotas